Joseph Clanton (born November 1, 1972) is an American race car driver and businessman. He was the 2002 champion in the now-defunct American Speed Association stock car series. He is also the owner of two Zaxby's franchises.

Busch Series
Clanton made his debut in the then-NASCAR Busch Series in the 2003 Hardee's 250 at Richmond International Raceway. Driving the #27 Trim Spa Pontiac for Brewco Motorsports, he started and finished 22nd. Clanton would drive in seventeen more races and earn one top 10 finish, a career-best 5th at Pikes Peak. After the Stacker 200 Presented by YJ Stinger, Clanton was replaced in the car by Chase Montgomery, whom he had replaced earlier in the season. He has not returned to the series since then.

Craftsman Truck Series
In 2004, Clanton made his debut in the NASCAR Craftsman Truck Series, driving the #40 Chevrolet for Key Motorsports. In his first race at Daytona International Speedway, he crashed and finished 32nd. He also crashed the next race, finishing 31st at Atlanta. Clanton would not return to the series until 2007, when he brought Zaxby's sponsorship to the #09 Ford of JTG Racing. Sharing the ride with Stacy Compton, he ran in 16 of the 25 series events and earned five top 10s, including a career best of 6th at both Daytona and Atlanta.

During the offseason, it was announced that Clanton would take the sponsorship and number and run full-time for Roush Fenway Racing in 2008. After wrecking himself and teammate Colin Braun in offseason testing and then crashing out of the season-opening race at Daytona, he was released and replaced by Travis Kvapil effective immediately.

Motorsports career results

NASCAR
(key) (Bold – Pole position awarded by qualifying time. Italics – Pole position earned by points standings or practice time. * – Most laps led.)

Busch Series

Craftsman Truck Series

References

External links
 
 

American Speed Association drivers
American sports businesspeople
NASCAR drivers
Living people
1972 births
People from Stockbridge, Georgia
Racing drivers from Atlanta
Racing drivers from Georgia (U.S. state)
Businesspeople from Georgia (U.S. state)
21st-century American businesspeople
RFK Racing drivers